Vorges is a commune in the Aisne department in Hauts-de-France in northern France.

Population

People associated with the commune
 Édouard Fleury (1815–83): Historian, writer
 Champfleury (1821–89): Journalist, writer
 Gaston Ganault (1831–94): Barrister, deputy
 Ernest Ganault (1868–1936): Doctor, deputy
 Hector de Pétigny (1904-1992): Artist
 Charles Wolf (1827-1918): Astronomer

See also
Communes of the Aisne department

References

Communes of Aisne
Aisne communes articles needing translation from French Wikipedia